Pietro da Cortona (1 November 1596 or 159716 May 1669) was an Italian Baroque painter and architect. Along with his contemporaries and rivals Gian Lorenzo Bernini and Francesco Borromini, he was one of the key figures in the emergence of Roman Baroque architecture. He was also an important designer of interior decorations.

He was born Pietro Berrettini, but is primarily known by the name of his native town of Cortona in Tuscany. He worked mainly in Rome and Florence. He is best known for his frescoed ceilings such as the vault of the salone or main salon of the Palazzo Barberini in Rome and carried out extensive painting and decorative schemes for the Medici family in Florence and for the Oratorian fathers at the church of Santa Maria in Vallicella in Rome.  He also painted numerous canvases. Only a limited number of his architectural projects were built but nonetheless they are as distinctive and as inventive as those of his rivals.

Biography

Early career
Berrettini was born into a family of artisans and masons, in Cortona, then a town in the Grand Duchy of Tuscany. He trained in painting in Florence under Andrea Commodi, but soon he departed for Rome at around 1612/3, where he joined the studio of Baccio Ciarpi. He was involved in fresco decorations at the Palazzo Mattei in 1622-3 under the direction of Agostino Ciampelli and Cardinal Orsini had commissioned from him an Adoration of the Shepherds (c. 1626) for San Salvatore in Lauro.

In Rome, he had encouragement from many prominent patrons. Such contacts helped him gain an early major commission in Rome (1624–1626), a fresco decoration in the church of Santa Bibiana that was being renovated under the direction of Bernini. In 1626, the Sacchetti family engaged Cortona to paint three large canvases of The Sacrifice of Polyxena, The Triumph of Bacchus, and The Rape of the Sabines (the latter, c. 1629), and to paint a series of frescoes in the Villa Sacchetti at Castelfusano, near Ostia, using a team that included the young Andrea Sacchi. In the Sacchetti orbit, he met Pope Urban VIII and Cardinal Francesco Barberini, the papal nephew, and their patronage of Cortona provided him with ample scope to demonstrate his abilities as a painter of frescoes and canvases.

Grand Salon of Palazzo Barberini

Fresco cycles were numerous in Cortona's Rome; many represented "quadri riportati" or painted framed episodes imitating canvases as found in the Sistine Chapel ceiling or in Carracci's The Loves of the Gods in the Farnese gallery (completed 1601). In 1633, Pope Urban VIII (Maffeo Barberini) commissioned from Cortona a large fresco painting for the main salon ceiling of the Barberini family palace; the Palazzo Barberini. It was completed six years later, following Cortona's influential visit to northern Italy where he would have seen at first hand perspectival works by Paolo Veronese and the colour palette of Titian.

Cortona's huge Allegory of Divine Providence and Barberini Power marks a watershed in Baroque painting. Following the architecture of the room, he created the painted illusion of an open airy architectural framework against which figures are situated, usually seen 'al di sotto in su' apparently coming into the room itself or floating far above it. The ornamented architectural framework essentially forms five compartments. The central and most significant part celebrates the glorification of the reign of Urban VIII in a light filled scene populated with allegorical figures and Barberini family emblems.

The illusion of spatial extension through paint, the grandiose theme and the skill of execution could only astonish and impress the visitor. However, Cortona's panegyric trompe-l'œil extravaganzas may be less popular in a world familiar with minimalism and such like, yet they are precursors of the sunny figures and cherubim infested with rococo excesses. They contrast markedly with the darker naturalism prominent in Caravaggisti works and with the classicising compositions by painters such as Domenichino and Andrea Sacchi, and remind us that Baroque painting could be grand in an epic manner and exuberant in spirit.

Frescoes in Palazzo Pitti 

Cortona had been patronized by the Tuscan community in Rome, hence it was not surprising when he was passing through Florence in 1637, that he should be asked by Grand Duke Ferdinando II de' Medici to paint a series of frescoes intended to represent Ovid's Four Ages of Man in the small Sala della Stufa, a room in the Palazzo Pitti. The first two frescoes represented the "ages" of gold and silver. In 1641, he was recalled to paint the 'Bronze Age' and 'Iron Age' frescoes. It is said he was guided in the formulation of the allegorical designs by Michelangelo Buonarroti the Younger.

He thus began work on the decoration of the grand-ducal reception rooms on the first floor of the Palazzo Pitti, now part of the Palatine Gallery. In these five Planetary Rooms, the hierarchical sequence of the deities is based on Ptolomeic cosmology; Venus, Apollo, Mars, Jupiter (the Medici Throne room) and Saturn, but minus Mercury and the Moon which should have come before Venus. These highly ornate ceilings with frescoes and elaborate stucco work essentially celebrate the Medici lineage and the bestowal of virtuous leadership.  Pietro left Florence in 1647 to return to Rome, and his pupil and collaborator, Ciro Ferri, was left to complete the cycle by the 1660s.

Late works

For a number of years, Cortona was involved for decades in the decoration of the ceiling frescoes in the Oratorian Chiesa Nuova (Santa Maria in Vallicella) in Rome, a work not finished until 1665. Other frescoes are in Palazzo Pamphilj in Piazza Navona (1651–4).

In 1660, he executed The Stoning of Saint Stephen for the church of San Ambrogio della Massima in Rome. The work currently hangs in the Hermitage.

Towards the end of his life he devoted much of his time to architecture, but he published a treatise on painting in 1652 under a pseudonym and in collaboration. He refused invitations to both France and Spain.

Debate with Andrea Sacchi
He was elected as director of the Academy of St Luke the painter's guild in Rome, in 1634. It was at the Academy in 1636 that Cortona and Andrea Sacchi were involved in theoretical controversies regarding the number of figures that were appropriate in a painted work.

Sacchi argued for few figures, since he felt it was not possible to grant meaningful individuality, a distinct role, to more than a few figures per scene. Cortona, on the other hand, lobbied for an art that could accommodate many subplots to a central concept. He also likely viewed the possibility of using many human figures in decorative detail or to represent a general concept. Within the context of this debate, the french painter Nicolas Poussin is known to have laughed at this discussion around fixed numbers. Others have seen in this dichotomy, the long-standing debate whether visual art is about theoretical principles and meant to narrate a full story, or a painterly decorative endeavor, meant to delight the senses. Cortona was a director of the Accademia from 1634 to 1638.

Cortona also contributed to a treatise in Florence along with the theologian and Jesuit Giandomenico Ottonelli titled: Trattato della pittura e scultura, uso et abuso loro: composto da un theologo ed da un pittore (Stamperia, Giovanni Antonio Bonardi, Florence, 1652). Authorship in subsequent editions is attributed to Cortona.

Pupils
Cortona employed or trained many prominent artists, who then disseminated his grand manner style. Apart from Ciro Ferri, others that worked in his studio included:

Romanelli and Camassei also trained under Domenichino. Giovanni Maria Bottala was one of his assistants on the Barberini Ceiling. Sources for (W); while sources for (H). Source for MB is Dictionary of Painters and Engravers, Biographical and Critical (Volume II L-Z).

Architectural projects

Among Cortona's more important architectural projects are the church of Santi Luca e Martina (completed in 1664, the church of the Accademia di San Luca, located in the Roman Forum. While Cortona was principe or director of the Accademia from 1634–38, he obtained permission to dig in the crypt of the church, which led the likely mistaken finding of remains attributed to the first century Roman martyr and Saint Martina. This discovery led to further patronage for construction of the church. The layout is almost a Greek cross, with four nearly identical wings extending from the striking central dome. Much of the ground structure is undecorated, above intricately decorated. The overwhelmingly vertical decoration of the facade is granted liveliness by horizontal convexity. In his will, this bachelor called this church his beloved daughter.

He also renovated the exterior renewal of the ancient Santa Maria della Pace (1656–1667), and the façade (with an unusual loggia) of Santa Maria in Via Lata (appr. 1660).

Another influential work for its day was the design and decoration of the Villa Pigneto commissioned by the Marchese Sacchetti. This garden palace or casino gathered a variety of features in a novel fashion, including a garden facade with convex arms, and highly decorated niches, and elaborate tiered staircases surrounding a fountain.

Anatomical plates
Prior to becoming famous as an architect, Pietro drew anatomical plates that would not be engraved and published until a hundred years after his death. The plates in Tabulae anatomicae are now thought to have been started around 1618. The dramatic and highly studied poses effected by the figures are in keeping with the style of other Renaissance Baroque anatomical artists, although nowhere does such an approach find any fuller expression than in these plates.

Gallery

Notes

References
Connors, Joseph (1982). "Cortona, Pietro Berrettini da" Placzek 1982; vol. 1, pp. 455–466.

Merz, Jörg Martin (2008). Pietro da Cortona and Roman Baroque Architecture. New Haven; London: Yale University Press. .
Placzek, Adolf K., editor (1982). Macmillan Encyclopedia of Architects. London: Macmillan. .

External links

Tabulae anatomicae
Pietro da Cortona, A Design for a Quarantore at San Lorenzo in Damaso, c.1632

Pietro da Cortona
Italian Baroque architects
Italian Baroque painters
Italian interior designers
1596 births
1669 deaths
Architects from Lazio
Painters from Rome
People from Cortona
Italian male painters
17th-century Italian architects
17th-century Italian painters
Architects of Roman Catholic churches
Catholic painters